The Seychelles Football Federation (SFF) is the governing body of football in the Seychelles. The current president is Elvis Chetty and it was founded in 1980, and affiliated to FIFA and to CAF in 1986. It organizes the Seychelles First Division, the Seychelles FA Cup, the men's national team, and the women's national team.

References

External links
Seychelles at the FIFA website.
 Seychelles at CAF Online

Seychelles
Football in Seychelles
1979 establishments in Seychelles
Sports organizations established in 1979